Apodiphus amygdali is a species of shield bug belonging to the family Pentatomidae, subfamily Pentatominae.

Distribution
This species can be found in Austria, Albania, Bulgaria, Greece, Italy and North Macedonia.

Description

The females are slightly larger than the males. Body is oval, convex dorsally, blackish brown, densely speckled with yellow ocher spots. The pronotum has dentate and concave lateral margins. On the head and pronotum there is a short ocher or yellowish longitudinal line. The connexivum shows black and ocher or yellowish spots. The long legs and antennae are gray-brown to black.

Biology
Imago and nymphs of these large bugs suck on the stems, leaves and immature fruits of various deciduous trees and are considered an agricultural pest. They mainly feed on plum (Prunus domestica), apricot (Prunus armeniaca), apple (Malus pumila), olive (Olea europaea), pear (Pyrus communis) and pistachio (Pistacia vera). They attack also silver poplar (Populus alba), Turkish pine (Pinus brutia), plane (Platanus orientalis), field elm (Ulmus minor) and silver willow (Salix alba).

They have two generations a year, the first at the end of June and the second at mid-August. Adults of this second generation over winter from October to May. The fertilized females lay on the underside of the leaves masses of eleven to fifteen eggs, which take two to five days to hatch. Nymphs pass through five moltings.

References

 Rider D.A., 2004 - Family Pentatomidae - Catalogue of the Heteroptera of the Palaearctic Region

Halyini
Hemiptera of Europe
Insects described in 1817
Taxa named by Ernst Friedrich Germar